Thiago Fernandes Oliveira (born 9 June 1992) is a footballer who plays as a midfielder for Kirivong Sok Sen Chey. Born in Brazil, he was an East Timor youth international.

Career

Before the 2015 season, Fernandes signed for Brazilian second tier side Monte Azul.
In 2015, he signed for Budaiya in the Bahraini second tier. Before the 2016 season, he signed for Indonesian top flight club Persipura. Before the second half of 2016–17, Fernandes signed for Al-Fahaheel in Kuwait. Before the 2018 season, he signed for Brazilian top flight team Operário-VG.

In 2019, he signed for Ka I in Macau after trialing for Indian top flight outfit Gokulam Kerala and PSIS in Indonesia.  In 2021, Fernandes signed for Brazilian second tier side Fluminense do Itaum. Before the 2022 season, he signed for Kirivong in Cambodia.

References

External links

 Thiago Fernandes at playmakerstats.com

1992 births
Al-Fahaheel FC players
Association football midfielders
Atlético Monte Azul players
Brazilian expatriate footballers
Brazilian expatriate sportspeople in Bahrain
Brazilian expatriate sportspeople in Cambodia
Brazilian expatriate sportspeople in Indonesia
Brazilian expatriate sportspeople in Kuwait
Brazilian expatriate sportspeople in Macau
Brazilian footballers
Budaiya Club players
CE Operário Várzea-Grandense players
East Timorese expatriate footballers
East Timorese expatriate sportspeople in Indonesia
East Timorese footballers
East Timorese people of Brazilian descent
Expatriate footballers in Bahrain
Expatriate footballers in Cambodia
Expatriate footballers in Indonesia
Expatriate footballers in Kuwait
Expatriate footballers in Macau
Kuwait Premier League players
Living people
Persipura Jayapura players
Windsor Arch Ka I players